Hydrohalite is a mineral that occurs in saturated halite brines at cold temperatures (below 0.1 °C). It was first described in 1847 in Dürrnberg, Austria. It exists in cold weather.

Hydrohalite has a high nucleation energy, and solutions will normally need to be supercooled for crystals to form. Above this temperature, liquid water saturated with salt can exist in equilibrium with hydrohalite. Hydrohalite has a strong positive temperature coefficient of solubility, unlike halite. Hydrohalite decomposes at 0.1°C, giving a salty brine and solid halite. Under pressure, hydrohalite is stable between 7,900 and 11,600 atmospheres pressure. The decomposition point increases at the rate of 0.007°K per atmosphere (for 1–1000 atmospheres). The maximum decomposition temperature is at 25.8°C under 9400 atmospheres. Above this pressure the decomposition point goes down.

Ceres
Hydrohalite was discovered on Ceres by Dawn, suggesting an early ocean, possibly surviving as a relict ocean.

References

Hydrohalite mineral information and data
Hydrohalite Mineral Data

Halide minerals
Sodium minerals
Monoclinic minerals
Minerals in space group 14